The Olympus PEN E-PL2, was announced in early January 2011 at the CES.  This is Olympus Corporation's fourth camera that uses the Micro Four Thirds mount after the Olympus PEN E-P1, Olympus PEN E-P2 and Olympus PEN E-PL1. At the time it was announced, it had a US dollar MSRP of $599.99. As with earlier PEN models, the E-PL2 is aimed in between the point-and-shoot (compact camera) and D-SLR markets.

Noteworthy changes from the Olympus PEN E-PL1 model include:
 Arguably slightly improved in-body Image Stabilisation (IS) at 4EV equivalent.
 Bulb (long exposure) with cable-release option (RM-UC1 remote cable) up to 30m
 3" LCD higher resolution 460,000 pixel screen 
 1/4000s shutter speed

Micro Four Thirds Camera introduction roadmap

References

External links

Photography is Fun

PEN E-PL2
Live-preview digital cameras
Cameras introduced in 2011

ru:Olympus PEN E-PL1